When I Die, Will I Get Better? is the third studio album from the British post-hardcore band Svalbard. Announced on 7 July 2020, the album was released worldwide on 25 September 2020, through Church Road Records. The album discusses themes of feminism and mental health, with a focus on depression and suicide.

The album was promoted through the release of two singles, "Open Wound" and "Listen to Someone".

Track listing

Reception
When I Die, Will I Get Better? was released to positive reception from critics. Matt Mills of Metal Hammer named it "the most important British metal record of 2020". The music distribution website Bandcamp listed it as the "Album of the Day" on 30 September 2020.

Accolades

References

Further reading
 Album Review: Svalbard - 'When I Die, Will I Get Better?'
 Hardcore Band Svalbard Interviewed About New Album 'When I Die, Will I Get Better?'
 'Listen To Someone': Svalbard tackle depression and mental illness
 Album Review: Svalbard – When I Die, Will I Get Better?

Svalbard (band) albums
Black metal albums by British artists
Melodic hardcore albums
2020 albums